Julie Andreyev (born 1962) is a Vancouver-based multidisciplinary artist whose practice explores themes of animal agency and consciousness. 
Her ongoing Animal Lover work explores nonhuman animal agency and creativity through modes of interspecies collaboration and aleatoric methods. 
The Animal Lover projects seek to contribute towards an ethic of compassion and regard for the intrinsic worth of other-than-human individuals. She was born in Burnaby, British Columbia.

Education
Andreyev received her Diploma of Fine Arts degree from the Emily Carr University of Art + Design in 1988. She received a Master of Arts degree from the Simon Fraser University in 1999. She is currently a PhD candidate in Graduate Liberal Studies, Simon Fraser University where her research examines compassion as a means for improved human awareness and relationship with more-than-human worlds.

Career
Julie Andreyev is currently an associate professor at the Emily Carr University of Art + Design, and Artistic Director of Interactive Futures.

Her work has been shown across Canada, in the US, Europe and Japan in galleries and festivals such as the Peabody Essex Museum, the Vancouver Art Gallery, SIGGRAPH, Vancouver 2010 Cultural Olympiad, Viper, CHI, Japan Media Arts Festival, Digital Art Weeks, and Nuit Blanche.

Art
Andreyev's art is concerned with issues surrounding new media, social media, technology and human/nonhuman relationships. The Animal Lover projects are often produced in collaboration with companion dogs Tom and Sugi where respect, fun and challenge are employed in the process. The dogs participate directly in the research and content creation of the work by suggesting ideas for projects and by determining the material for production. Also, aleatoric and improvisational methods are used that provide for a chance, open-ended expectation, surprise and learning.

Her work is support by The Canada Council for the Arts, The British Columbia Arts Council, Foreign Affairs Canada, and the  Social Sciences and Humanities Research Council of Canada (SSHRC).

The following are some examples of her work.

Vegan Congress

Andreyev is founding member of the Vegan Congress, an activist group that creates relational projects to help develop discourse and practical ethics and provides events and information about vegan practice. One of the objectives of the project is to make ethical practice more visible within the community. Currently, the Vegan Congress consists of like-minded faculty, staff and students at Emily Carr University who practice veganism.

Scratch Theremin

For Scratch Theremin, Andreyev works with canine Tom using interactive software and a theremin to produce a collaborative improvisational interspecies performance.
The aim of the project is to advance methods of improvisation and active listening, proposing live audio soundscapes that mesh canine sounds with electroacoustic practice. In the process of developing this performance, a custom built theremin, that incorporates a rug as an interface, was created to allow Tom to use scratch and digging gestures to create sound, accompanied by a diverse range of vocalization. These studio performances are audio recorded for use later in the live performance where they are remixed into a new experimental improvisational soundscape. Andreyev accompanies Tom's vocals and rhythms with her own live theremin and software performance.

*glisten) HIVE

*glisten) HIVE is a digital media project commissioned by 'CODE Live 2' for the Vancouver 2010 Cultural Olympiad, in which Twitter posts about animal consciousness were visualized in a real-time exhibition space. The collective online communication from participants were visualized as emergent swarms of text, and incorporated a soundscape of vocalizations from Andreyev's dog, Tom.

Rockstar 

For this video work, Andreyev uses audio and visual representations of her canine companion Tom to speculate on his subjective and emotional experience traveling in a car by examining the notion that a canine's sense of smell is a locus for heightened sensitivity and empirical intelligence. The visuals refer to a psychedelic experience, metaphorically representing Tom's experience. The visuals are accompanied by a soundscape constructed from studio recordings of Tom's voice and car engine sounds to create connotative rhythmic and harmonic modes.

Tom and Sugi Blog / @Tom_and_Sugi 

The Tom and Sugi Blog and @Tom_and_Sugi are social media projects, maintained as part of Andreyev's ongoing interspecies collaborative Animal Lover projects, in which animal consciousness and creativity is explored through compassionate means of interactive installation, video and social media.
The projects use a Twitter feed to represent the first person point of view of the canines Tom and Sugi and their everyday activities. The blog represent a human reflection on the subjective experience of the canines in their relationship to the artist.

Selected exhibitions

2010
Passages, Art Gallery of Mississauga, Mississauga, ON (solo)
CUE: Artists' Videos, Vancouver Art Gallery, Vancouver, BC, curated by Daina Augaitis and Christopher Eamon
Code Live 2, commissioned by Cultural Olympiad Digital Edition, Vancouver, BC

2011 
Interactive Futures '11: Animal Influence, Vancouver
Random Elements – a Celebration of Iannis Xenakis, Vancouver New Music, Vancouver
Tracing Home, SIGGRAPH 2011 Art Gallery, Vancouver, BC
Signal & Noise Festival, VIVO, Vancouver, BC
User in Flux, CHI Workshop 2011, Vancouver, BC

2012 
Taking Time, Surrey Urban Screen, Surrey Art Gallery, Surrey, Canada
Information, Ecology, Wisdom, The 3rd Art and Science International Exhibition, Beijing
performance, platform. body affects, Sophiensaele, Berlin
Vanimaux II, Remington/Gam Gallery, Vancouver
Facing the Animal, OR Gallery, Vancouver
Vancouver Experimental Theremin Orchestra, Utopia Festival, W2, Vancouver

2013 
 Beyond Human: Artist – Animal Collaborations, Peabody Essex Museum, Salem, Mass.
2000 Meilen Unter Dem Meer, Vancouver Experimental Theremin Orchestra, VIVO, Vancouver

Awards and grants

Doctoral Award, Social Sciences and Humanities Research Council of Canada
Provost's Prize of Distinction, Simon Fraser University, Burnaby
Special Graduate Entrance Award, Graduate Studies, Simon Fraser University, Burnaby
Travel Grant, The Canada Council for the Arts
New Media and Audio Art Production Grant, The Canada Council for the Arts
Public Outreach: Summer Institute, Workshop and Conference Grant, Social Sciences and Humanities Research Council of Canada
Professional Project Assistance for Media Arts Organizations, British Columbia Arts Council
Image, Text, Sound and Technology: Summer Institute, Workshop, Conference Grant, Social Sciences and Humanities Research Council of Canada
Visual and Media Arts Grant, Arts Promotion Division, Foreign Affairs Canada
Project Assistance For Media Artists, British Columbia Arts Council
Project Assistance for Visual Artists, British Columbia Arts Council
Strategic Research Grant, Social Sciences and Humanities Research Council of Canada
BAFTA (British Academy of Film and Television Arts) Interactive Award (Nominee)
MAD '03NET Project Award, 2nd International Meeting of Experimental Arts in Madrid
Creation/Production Grant, The Canada Council for the Arts
Graduate Fellowship, Graduate Liberal Studies, Simon Fraser University

Publications

"Why Look at Animals in Landscapes?", catalogue essay in The Reflexive Animal, SFU Gallery, Simon Fraser University, Burnaby, Canada. 2012
"Endangered Whales and Dolphins Affected by Tankers", The Common Sense Canadian, July 16, 2012
"Dog Voice: A Memoir", Interactive Futures '11: Animal Influence, Antennae, Issue 21, 2012
"People Respond to Images that Provide Hope", interview with Sam Easterson, Interactive Futures '11: Animal Influence, Antennae, Issue 22, 2012
"Wait", Leonardo, Special Issue Volume 44, Number 4, ACM SIGGRAPH, MIT Press, Leonardo/ISAST, Cambridge, Mass., USA
"Animal Lover: Aria", Art Catalogue/Computational Aesthetics 2009,  Eurographics Association, Germany.
"Four Wheel Drift," (with Petra Watson), Transdisciplinary Digital Art: Sound, Vision and the New Screen, Randy Adams, Steve Gibson, Stefan Muller-Arisona (Eds), Springer, Berlin.
"I Want More Life Fucker!" catalogue essay for exhibition Welcome to the Desert of the Real, Concourse Gallery, Emily Carr Institute of Art, Design & Media, Vancouver.
"The Last Seduction: Theorizing the Cinematic Female Killer", Foundational Narratives: Proceedings from the Foundational Narratives Interdisciplinary Graduate Student Conference, Stephen Collis and Sharon-Ruth Alker, eds., Simon Fraser University, Vancouver, BC
"The Blasphemous Image: Donna Haraway's Cyborg Manifesto and Representations of the Cyborg in Popular Film", The Journal of Graduate Liberal Studies, Volume III, Number 2, Spring, 1998, R. Barry Levis ed., NC State University, Raleigh, USA.

References

External links 
 

Canadian women artists
Living people
Canadian contemporary artists
Canadian multimedia artists
1962 births
Visual arts by animals
People from Burnaby
Artists from British Columbia